Ridhima Ghosh is an Indian Bengali film and television  actress. She made her acting debut in the Bengali film Ratporir Rupkotha in 2007. In 2009, she made her television  debut in Bengali TV serial Bou Kotha Kao  aired in Star Jalsha. After that, she has acted in a number of Bengali films and Bengali TV serials like Rang Milanti, Rajkahini and Byomkesh.

Personal life
Ridhima was born on 18 January 1989. She married actor Gaurav Chakrabarty on 28 November 2017. Their first film Rang Milanti was released in 2011. Ridhima is the daughter-in-law of actor Sabyasachi Chakrabarty and actress Mithu Chakrabarty. Her brother-in-law is actor Arjun Chakrabarty.

Career
Ridhima was first cast in a role in the Bengali film Raatporir Rupkotha in 2007. Her first TV series Bou Kotha Kao which was aired in TV channel Star Jalsha in 2009 and second film Friend was directed by Satabdi Roy, which was released in 2009. Her third film Amar Sangi brought her huge success which lasted for 13 weeks in cinemas. Her fourth film Rang Milanti, directed by Kaushik Ganguly that released in September 2011 to wide critical & commercial acclaim. She also featured in the ensemble cast for Kaushik's movie Laptop which was selected for screening at Indian Panorama section of the 42nd International Film Festival of India at Goa (IFFI 2011:23 Nov.-3 Dec.). The film also had an international premier at the Dubai International Film Festival (DIFF 2011) where it competed for the Muhr AsiaAfrica Awards for feature films. Her film Amar Bodyguard directed by Haranath Chakraborty, which ran for more than 150 days.

Her first appearance in television Bou Kotha Kao. Her second TV series Byomkesh was aired in Coloros Bangla where she played the role of Satyabati. Then last she has been seen in Mahanayak aired in Star Jalsha.

Ridhima also became the first celebrity model for the first edition of the FFACE Calendar.

Filmography

Television

Short films & web series

TVCs

Awards & nominations

References

External links
 

Actresses in Bengali cinema
Indian film actresses
Living people
Actresses from Kolkata
21st-century Indian actresses
Bengali actresses
Bengali female models
Bengali television actresses
Indian television actresses
Female models from Kolkata
Bhawanipur Education Society College alumni
University of Calcutta alumni
Bengali Hindus
1989 births